Georges Auguste Dejaeghère (born 7 January 1879, died 1955) was a French gymnast. He competed in the men's individual all-around event at the 1900 Summer Olympics.

He also took part in the first gymnastics World Championships which took place in 1903, where he won gold in the pommel horse together with his compatriot Joseph Lux and Hendricus Thijsen of the Netherlands. Overall, he finished in fourth. At the 1905 World Championships, he repeated his results from  1903, with gold in the pommel horse, this time alone, and fourth place overall.

On a national level, he was French gymnastics champion in 1904.

References

External links
 

French male artistic gymnasts
1879 births
1955 deaths
World champion gymnasts
Medalists at the World Artistic Gymnastics Championships
Olympic gymnasts of France
Gymnasts at the 1900 Summer Olympics
Place of birth missing